Filippo Marsigli (1790 in Portici, near Naples – 1863) was an Italian painter, mainly of grand manner historic paintings in a Neoclassic style in Naples, Italy. He was a professor in the Academy of Fine Arts of Naples.

Biography
Along with Camillo Guerra, Gennaro Maldarelli, and Giuseppe Cammarano, in 1841 he helped fresco ceilings in the rooms of the Royal Palace of Naples. In 1825, his La Tomba dell'uomo da bene won a prize at a Neapolitan exhibition. Marsigli completed the sala d’Amore, now the reading hall in the National library. In the four ovals, he depicted stories of the Hours and Cupid: Tersicore che invita le Ore alla danza, La danza delle Ore, Prigionia di Cupido, and Fuga di Cupido. The same coterie of painters decorated the apse of the Cathedral of Caserta. His brother Giuseppe Marsigli was also a painter.

References

18th-century Italian painters
Italian male painters
19th-century Italian painters
Painters from Naples
Italian neoclassical painters
Year of birth uncertain
1863 deaths
19th-century Italian male artists
18th-century Italian male artists